People on the Bridge is a 1959 Soviet drama film directed by Aleksandr Zarkhi.

Plot 
After the liquidation of the central board, chief Ivan Denisovich Bulygin had to return to his former profession and become a bridge builder. The family says goodbye to a comfortable life and goes to the construction of a bridge across the Severnaya River.

Cast 
 Vasili Merkuryev as Ivan Bulygin 
 Natalya Medvedeva as Anna Semyonovna  
 Aleksandra Zavyalova as Lena  
 Oleg Tabakov as Viktor Bulygin 
 Lyudmila Kasyanova as Olya  
 Yevgeny Shutov as Orlov 
 Vladimir Druzhnikov as Odintsov  
 Gleb Glebov as Paromov 
 Stepan Kayukov as Ilya Ilyich Khorkov

References

External links 
 

1959 films
1950s Russian-language films
Soviet drama films
1959 drama films
Mosfilm films
Films directed by Aleksandr Zarkhi